Periscelididae is a family of flies.

Description
Periscelididae are small flies, 3-4 mm long. The head is distinctly broader than high and the cheek is broad and bulging posteriorly. The postocellar bristles are present and diverging. The ocellar bristles are present, there are two orbital bristles on each side of frons, the anterior orbital bristle is directed forward and towards the median line. There is one pair of frontal bristles, curving backward. Interfrontal bristles are absent. Vibrissae (a row of vibrissa-like bristles) are well developed. On the mesonotum there are two pairs of dorsoscentral bristles. The costa is continuous (not interrupted), the subcosta is incomplete. The posterior basal wing cell and discoidal wing cell are fused and the anal vein does not reach the margin of the wings. The wing is clear or milky or with infuscated spots. Tibiae are usually banded and without dorsal preapical bristles.

Genera
These 12 genera belong to the family Periscelididae:
Periscelidinae Oldenberg, 1914
Diopsosoma Malloch, 1932 c g
Marbenia Malloch, 1931
Neoscutops Malloch, 1926 c g
Parascutops Mathis & Papp, 1992 c g
Periscelis Loew, 1858 i c g b
Scutops Coquillett, 1904 c g
Stenomicrinae Papp, 1984
Cyamops Melander, 1913 i c g b
Myodris Lioy, 1864 g
Planinasus Cresson, 1948 c g
Procyamops Hoffeins & Rung, 2005 g
Stenocyamops Papp, 2006 c g
Stenomicra Coquilett, 1900 i c g b

Data sources: i = ITIS, c = Catalogue of Life, g = GBIF, b = Bugguide.net

Species Lists
West Palaearctic including Russia
Japan
World list

Phylogeny

Read also
Morphology of Diptera

References

Mc Alpine, J. F. 1987. Chapter 77. Periscelididae. Pp. 895-898 in McAlpine, J.F., Peterson, B.V., Shewell, G.E., Teskey, H.J., Vockeroth, J.R. and D.M. Wood (eds.), Manual of Nearctic Diptera. Volume 2. Agriculture Canada Monograph 28: i-vi, 675-1332.
Stackelberg, A.A. Family Periscelididae in  Bei-Bienko, G. Ya, 1988 Keys to the insects of the European Part of the USSR Volume 5 (Diptera) Part 2 English edition.Keys to Palaearctic species but now needs revision.Uncertain family diagnosis.

External links

Periscelididae in Italian.

 
Brachycera families